Sandokanidae is a family of harvestmen in the suborder Laniatores, formerly referred to as Oncopodidae (the name was replaced because of the secondary homonymy of the type genus Oncopus, replaced by Sandokan; this made the change of family name mandatory)

Name
The name of the type genus is based on the name of a fictional Bornean prince-pirate.

Description
Sandokanidae range in body size from about 2–11 mm. Their legs are relatively short and stout. Most species are amber colored with some dark brown patterns. A few undescribed Gnomulus species are orange.

Distribution
This family is known from Southeast Asia from Indonesia, almost reaching New Guinea on Waigeo, up north into the Himalayan region.

Relationships
Sandokanidae are probably the sister group to all other Grassatores.

Species
 Biantoncopus Martens & Schwendinger, 1998
 Biantoncopus fuscus Martens & Schwendinger, 1998 — Leyte (Philippines)

 Caenoncopus Martens & Schwendinger, 1998 — Sumatra
 Caenoncopus affinis Martens & Schwendinger, 1998
 Caenoncopus cuspidatus (Schwendinger, 1992)
 Caenoncopus tenuis Martens & Schwendinger, 1998

 Gnomulus Thorell, 1890
 Gnomulus aborensis (Roewer, 1913) — Arunachal Pradesh (northeast India)
 Gnomulus annulipes (Pocock, 1897) — Sarawak (Borneo)
 Gnomulus armillatus (Thorell, 1891) — Sumatra
 Gnomulus asli Martens & Schwendinger, 1998 — West Malaysia
 Gnomulus baharu Schwendinger, in Martens & Schwendinger 1998
 Gnomulus carinatus Schwendinger & Martens, 2002 — Kalimantan (Indonesia)
 Gnomulus claviger Schwendinger & Martens, 2002 — Luzon (Philippines)
 Gnomulus coniceps Martens & Schwendinger, 1998 — Luzon
 Gnomulus conigerus (Schwendinger, 1992) — Sabah (Malaysia)
 Gnomulus crassipes Schwendinger & Martens, 2002 — Luzon
 Gnomulus crucifer Martens & Schwendinger, 1998 — Luzon
 Gnomulus drescoi (Silhavy, 1962) — Sumatra
 Gnomulus exsudans Schwendinger & Martens, 2002 — Sabah
 Gnomulus goodnighti (Suzuki, 1977) — Mindanao (Philippines)
 Gnomulus hamatus Schwendinger & Martens, 2002 — Luzon
 Gnomulus hirsutus Martens & Schwendinger, 1998 — West Malaysia
 Gnomulus hutan Schwendinger & Martens, 2002 — Sarawak
 Gnomulus hyatti (Martens, 1977) — Nepal
 Gnomulus imadatei (Suzuki, 1970) — Brunei
 Gnomulus insularis (Roewer, 1927) — Penang? (Malaysia)
 Gnomulus javanicus Schwendinger & Martens, 2002 — Java
 Gnomulus laevis (Roewer, 1915) — Borneo
 Gnomulus lannaianus (Schwendinger, 1992) — Thailand
 Gnomulus laruticus Martens & Schwendinger, 1998 — West Malaysia
 Gnomulus latoperculum Schwendinger & Martens, 2002 — Sulawesi
 Gnomulus leofeae Schwendinger & Martens, 2002 — Burma
 Gnomulus leyteensis Martens & Schwendinger, 1998 — Leyte
 Gnomulus lomani Schwendinger & Martens, 2002 — Borneo, Sumatra?
 Gnomulus maculatus Martens & Schwendinger, 1998 — Luzon
 Gnomulus marginatus Schwendinger & Martens, 2002 — Thailand
 Gnomulus matabesar Schwendinger & Martens, 2002 — Halmahera (Indonesia)
 Gnomulus minor N. Tsurusaki, 1990 — Philippines
 Gnomulus monticola Schwendinger & Martens, 2002 — West Malaysia
 Gnomulus obscurus Schwendinger & Martens, 2002 — Sarawak
 Gnomulus palawanensis (S. Suzuki, 1982) — Palawan (Philippines)
 Gnomulus piliger (Pocock, 1903) — Thailand
 Gnomulus pilosus Schwendinger & Martens, 2002 — West Malaysia
 Gnomulus pulvillatus (Pocock, 1903) — West Malaysia
 Gnomulus rostratoideus Schwendinger & Martens, 2002 — West Malaysia, Singapore
 Gnomulus rostratus Thorell, 1890 — Penang
 Gnomulus ryssie Schwendinger & Martens, 2002 — Thailand
 Gnomulus sinensis Schwendinger & Martens, 2002 — Sichuan (China)
 Gnomulus spiniceps Schwendinger & Martens, 2002 — Vietnam
 Gnomulus sumatranus Thorell, 1891 — Sumatra
 Gnomulus sundaicus (Schwendinger, 1992) — Sarawak
 Gnomulus thorelli (Sørensen, 1932) — Java
 Gnomulus tuberculatus Schwendinger & Martens, 2002 — Sumatra
 Gnomulus tumidifrons Schwendinger & Martens, 2002 — Halmahera

 Sandokan Özdikmen & Kury, 2007 

 Sandokan doriae Thorell, 1876 — Sarawak
 Sandokan expatriatus (Schwendinger & Martens, 2004) — Thailand?
 Sandokan feae Thorell, 1890 — Penang
 Sandokan hosei Pocock, 1897 — Sarawak
 Sandokan lingga (Schwendinger & Martens, 2004) — Lingga Islands (Indonesia)
 Sandokan malayanus (Schwendinger & Martens, 2004) — West Malaysia
 Sandokan megachelis (Schwendinger, 1992) — Sabah
 Sandokan tiomanensis (Schwendinger & Martens, 2004) — Tioman Island (Malaysia)
 Sandokan truncatus Thorell, 1891 — Singapore

 Palaeoncopus Martens & Schwendinger, 1998 — Sumatra
 Palaeoncopus gunung Martens & Schwendinger, 1998
 Palaeoncopus katik Martens & Schwendinger, 1998
 Palaeoncopus kerdil Martens & Schwendinger, 1998

References

 's Biology Catalog: Oncopodidae

Harvestmen
Harvestman families